The 120mm M2 Rifled Heavy Mortar (pt: MORTEIRO PESADO 120mm M2 RAIADO) is a Brazilian 120 mm mortar designed to have great firepower, mobility, and flexibility. The RT-M2 is designed by the War Arsenal of Rio de Janeiro for the Brazilian Army artillery. The RT-M2 can be transported by ground or air, and can also be air dropped, and offers a 360° range without the necessity of re-positioning the base. The RT-M2 can use any 120 mm ammunition built to international standards.

Characteristics

Official name: Mrt P 120 M2 R (120 M2 heavy mortar)
Manufacturer: AGRJ - War Arsenal of Rio de Janeiro - Arsenal D. John VI
Caliber: 120 mm
Length: 3.060 m
Total Weight: 717 kg
Range: 6,5 km standard projectile or 13 km additional propulsion
Rate of fire: 18 rounds / min
Use: Command or Automatic

Ammunition: 
Conventional: High explosive
Signaling
Exercise
Illuminative
Smoke

References

External links
Photo:http://www.defesanet.com.br/laad07/imagens/2/ctex_mort_120.jpg

Artillery of Brazil
120mm mortars